Quinyambie or Quinyambie Station is a pastoral lease currently operating as a cattle station.

Description
Once owned by Sidney Kidman, the property is the third largest station in South Australia. The unusual name is an aboriginal word for excreta.

History
The station was established prior to 1886, and was owned in that year by Mr H. T. Whitty who was running sheep on the property, later moving 6,070 sheep from the property in 1887.  A carpenter employed at Quinyambie committed suicide by hanging himself after only one week on the job in 1888.

Although the 1916 season had been an excellent one, with tall grasses and full waterholes, the region suffered from drought for the next couple of years.

In 1923 over 4,500 head of cattle were purchased from Naryilco for the purpose of restocking Quinyambie, it was thought to be one of the biggest cattle deals of the time. By 1924 the area was being plagued by dingos, Quinyambie had been carrying flocks of up to 20,000 sheep but since the pest arrived numbers had dropped substantially.

A fire destroyed the homestead in 1945.

Following an outbreak of pleuro-pneumonia in the cattle at nearby Lake Frome Station, Quinyambie and other surrounding properties were placed under quarantine in 1950. It was estimated that 2,000 cattle were infected.  Quinyambie and the surrounding district suffered from a prolonged four year drought from 1950 to 1954, which was broken by good falls late that year, with  falling in one day.

Quinyambie was placed on the market in June 2010 when it was stocked with only 1,430 cattle. The maximum herd size is 11,000 head with an average of 9,000 head. The property was sold July 2010 to the Mutooroo Pastoral Company, run by the Morgan and Wells families, who own the adjoining Mulyungarie Station and other property in the region. Mulyungarie was running between 3,000 and 4,000 head of cattle and shares a  boundary fence with Quinyambie. It was believed that the sale price was between $8 million and $10 million.

The land occupying the extent of the Quinyambie pastoral lease was gazetted by the Government of South Australia as a locality in April 2013 under the name 'Quinyambie'.

See also
List of ranches and stations
List of the largest stations in Australia

References

Stations (Australian agriculture)
Pastoral leases in South Australia
Far North (South Australia)